The St. Matthew Cathedral Also São Mateus Cathedral  Is a Catholic church located in the municipality of São Mateus and is a reference in modern religious art in Brazil. It has in its interior impressionist paintings by Claudio Pastro, renowned artist of sacred art.

It was built in the form of a tent, since, according to Don Aldo Gerna, founding bishop of the cathedral, this is God's tent with men ("Behold the tabernacle of God with men" or "Behold the tent of God with men ").

The Cathedral of São Mateus is an imposing building, in the form of a tent. The construction of the temple began on November 15, 1987, the day of the laying of the first stone. Initial resources were obtained for this purpose with the sale of the building of the Holy Family (now CEUNES) and the state government, and to conclude it, donations were sought from Italian friends of Don Aldo and Diocesans.

The cathedral is enriched internally with Impressionist frescoes. The inauguration of the cathedral of St. Matthew was realized the 11 of December 1988, with the presence of Don Aldo Gerna, bishop of São Mateus.

See also
Roman Catholicism in Brazil
St. Matthew Cathedral

References

Roman Catholic cathedrals in Espírito Santo
Roman Catholic churches completed in 1988
Buildings and structures in Espírito Santo
20th-century Roman Catholic church buildings in Brazil